Mỹ Văn is former district of Hải Hưng province in South Vietnam. It was formed on February 24, 1979 from merger of former Văn Yên and Văn Mỹ districts.

References 

Former districts of Vietnam